The 2014 Euroformula Open Championship was a multi-event motor racing championship for single-seat open wheel formula racing cars that was held across Europe. The championship featured drivers competing in two-litre Formula Three racing cars built by Italian constructor Dallara which conformed to the technical regulations, or formula, for the championship. It was the first edition of the Euroformula Open Championship – following a name change in February 2014 – after five seasons at the European F3 Open Championship. It is also included a revived three-round Spanish Formula Three Championship, held within the season calendar.

Sandy Stuvik dominated the championship and clinched the title with a round to spare, collecting eleven wins in sixteen races. His RP Motorsport team-mate Artur Janosz was victorious at Portimão and the Hungaroring, finishing the season as runner-up. Campos Racing driver Álex Palou bookended the season, winning the opening race at the Nürburgring and the final race at Circuit de Barcelona-Catalunya. He also won a race at the Hungaroring and completed the top three in the standings, finishing a point behind Janosz.

A Championship Cup class was also held for older machinery, with Costantino Peroni taking the title after three race victories from four attempts. Both Peroni and Saud Al Faisal moved up to Dallara F312 chassis, and there were no further competitors in the class for the remainder of the season. RP Motorsport won the teams' championship, after the 13 wins for Stuvik and Janosz, while Palou's victories helped Campos Racing to the runner-up position. All three title winners repeated their titles in the Spanish championship standings. Stuvik won the drivers' title by 13 points from Palou, after 4 victories from the 6 counting races. Peroni was the only competitor in the Cup class, winning both races at Portimão, while RP Motorsport won 5 of 6 races to take the teams' standings.

Teams and drivers
 All cars were powered by Toyota engines. All Championship Class cars were equipped with the Dallara F312 chassis, while Championship Cup Class cars were equipped with the Dallara F308 chassis.